Rikke Marie Granlund (born 14 November 1989) is a Norwegian handball player for french league club Chambray Touraine Handball and the Norwegian national team.

She was selected to represent Norway at the 2020 European Women's Handball Championship. Also selected to represent Norway at the 2020 IHF Women's Olympic Qualification Tournaments.

Achievements
European Championship:
Winner: 2020
Danish Championship:
Winner: 2018/19, 2019/20
EHF Cup:
Finalist: 2019

References

External links

1989 births
Living people
Norwegian female handball players
Handball players from Oslo
Expatriate handball players
Norwegian expatriate sportspeople in Denmark